Dale Williams (born 26th March 1987) is a Welsh former footballer.

Beginning his career as a trainee with Yeovil Town, Williams made his professional debut at 16 years old. 

Williams signed for Shrewsbury on 25 May 2006, and made his Shrews debut in the 2006–07 opener against Mansfield Town, which finished 2–2.

Williams was called up to the Wales U21s alongside Edwards and Davies for the [[UEFA U-21 Championship 2007

Williams made appearances for Shrewsbury before choosing to terminate his contract on 31 January 2007. Upon leaving Shrewsbury, he was expected to sign with Kidderminster Harriers.

During November 2007, he played for Waikato FC in the New Zealand Football Championship. In July 2008 he signed for Welshpool Town.

Dale was forced to retire from the game due to medical reasons strongly advised by specialists in 2008.

References

External links

1987 births
Welsh footballers
Living people
Wales under-21 international footballers
English Football League players
Cymru Premier players
Yeovil Town F.C. players
Shrewsbury Town F.C. players
Aberystwyth Town F.C. players
Waikato FC players
Welshpool Town F.C. players
Association football forwards
Association football midfielders